Gregory Tilyard (born 19 March 1932) is an Australian former cricketer. He played one first-class match for Tasmania in 1960/61.

See also
 List of Tasmanian representative cricketers

References

External links
 

1932 births
Living people
Australian cricketers
Tasmania cricketers
Cricketers from Tasmania